Tobias Anselm (born 24 February 2000) is an Austrian professional footballer who plays for LASK.

Club career
He made his Austrian Football First League debut for FC Liefering on 22 September 2017 in a game against FC Blau-Weiß Linz.

On 27 August 2020, he joined WSG Swarovski Tirol on a season-long loan.

References

External links

 

2000 births
Living people
Austrian footballers
Association football midfielders
Austria youth international footballers
FC Liefering players
LASK players
WSG Tirol players
Austrian Football Bundesliga players
2. Liga (Austria) players